Bob Newman (born c. 1938) was an American football player.  He played college football for Washington State Cougars football team from 1956 to 1958.  He ranked second behind John Brodie among NCAA major college players with 1,240 passing yards in 1956.  In 10 games during the 1957 season, he completed 104 of 188 passes for 1,391 passing yards and 13 touchdowns, and he also compiled 1,444 yards of total offense. He led the NCAA major colleges that year in total offense and ranked second in passing yards. He also led the Pacific Coast Conference in 1957 in pass completions (104), pass completion percentage (55.3%), and passing touchdowns (13). Newman was unanimously selected as a first-team player on the Associated Press' 1957 All-Pacific Coast Conference football team. Newman was drafted by the San Francisco 49ers but did not make the team.  He signed with the Oakland Raiders in September 1960. He was inducted into the Washington State Hall of Fame in 2011.

See also
 List of NCAA major college football yearly passing leaders
 List of NCAA major college football yearly total offense leaders

References

American football quarterbacks
Washington State Cougars football players
Living people
1938 births
Place of birth missing (living people)